MMZ Avangard is a Moscow-based manufacturer and the sole supplier of missiles for the S-400 system. It is part of the Almaz-Antey group.

Avangard was established in 1942, and it has produced airframes for strategic surface-to-air missiles since the 1950s and is the lead production facility for the Fakel Design Bureau in Moscow. In its latest available annual report for 2012, the company stated that it was finishing work on starting serial production of the 40N6 missile. No information on its performance or commissioning has been released since.

In October 2012, the former director of the plant was arrested on charges of embezzlement, after being accused of signing consultancy contracts with shell companies.

Sanctions 
In January 2023 Japan imposed sanctions on MMZ Avangard.

References

External links
 

Defence companies of Russia
Manufacturing companies based in Moscow
Almaz-Antey
Ministry of the Aviation Industry (Soviet Union)
Defence companies of the Soviet Union